The women's heavyweight competition in powerlifting at the 2009 World Games took place on 26 July 2009 at the National Sun Yat-sen University, Sun Yat-San Hall in Kaohsiung, Taiwan.

Competition format
A total of 9 athletes entered the competition during the games. Each athlete had 3 attempts in each of 3 events: squat, bench press and deadlift. The athlete who achieved the highest score in Wilks points is the winner.

Results

References

External links
 Results on IWGA website

Powerlifting at the 2009 World Games